The Lycoteuthidae are a family of squid comprising four known genera in two subfamilies. They are small muscular squid characterised by a lack of hooks and by photophores present on the viscera, eyeballs and tentacles. They inhabit tropical and subtropical seas where the diel migrants which stay down in the mesopelagic zone during the day and migrate to the surface to feed at night. Some species show strong sexual dimorphism.

Species

Subfamily Lampadioteuthinae
Genus Lampadioteuthis
Lampadioteuthis megaleia
Subfamily Lycoteuthinae
Genus Lycoteuthis
Lycoteuthis lorigera
Lycoteuthis springeri
Genus Nematolampas
Nematolampas regalis
Nematolampas venezuelensis
Genus Selenoteuthis
Selenoteuthis scintillans

References

External links

Squid
Cephalopod families